is a train station located in Sawara-ku, Fukuoka. The station symbol is three wavy blue lines, representing Muromi River.

Lines

Platforms

Vicinity 
Muromi Post Office
Muromi River
Muromi Kindergarten
Fukuoka Expressway - Route 1
Fukuoka Elementary School
Muromi Wings Dormitory

History
July 26, 1981: Opening
December 12, 2003: Introduction of platform screen doors for the first time in Kyūshū

References 

Railway stations in Fukuoka Prefecture
Railway stations in Japan opened in 1981
Kūkō Line (Fukuoka City Subway)